Charles Edward Creager (April 28, 1873 – January 11, 1964) was an American newspaper publisher and editor and a U.S. Representative from Oklahoma.

Biography
Born in Montgomery County, Ohio near Dayton, Creager was the son of William Otterbein and Belle Basore Creager. He attended Ohio public schools and graduated from Northern Indiana University. He married Elizabeth Fleenor, and they had a son, Baron, and a daughter, Margaret. He enlisted as a sergeant major in the Fourth Ohio Volunteer Infantry during the Spanish–American War and served under General Nelson A. Miles in the Puerto Rican campaign.

Career
Creager also engaged in the newspaper business, being the city editor of the Columbus Press-Post from 1899 to 1901 and editor of the Daily Leader in Marietta, Ohio, from 1902 to 1904. He moved to Muskogee, Indian Territory (now Oklahoma) in November 1904 and engaged in the newspaper business once more, later becoming publisher and editor of several Oklahoma newspapers.

Elected as a Republican to the Sixty-first Congress, Creager served from March 4, 1909 to March 3, 1911. An unsuccessful candidate for reelection to the Sixty-second Congress in 1910, he was employed in the United States Indian Service and later engaged in oil production until 1934, when he retired.

Civic Affairs 
Creager was active in Freemasonry; elected to serve the organization in state leadership positions of Most Illustrious Grand Master of Cryptic Masons of Oklahoma (1920-1921) and Most Excellent Grand High Priest of the Grand Chapter of Royal Arch Masons of Oklahoma (1925-1926). He published A History of the Cryptic Rite Freemasonry in Oklahoma in 1925 and was a perpetual member of Muskogee Masonic Lodge No. 28 Ancient Free & Accepted Masons of Oklahoma.

Death
Creager died, of emphysema, at the Muskogee Veterans Administration Hospital on January 11, 1964 (age 90 years, 258 days). He is interred at Greenhill Cemetery in Muskogee, Muskogee County, Oklahoma,.

References

External links

 Encyclopedia of Oklahoma History and Culture – Creager, Charles
 

1873 births
1964 deaths
People from Montgomery County, Ohio
Republican Party members of the United States House of Representatives from Oklahoma
Politicians from Muskogee, Oklahoma
American military personnel of the Spanish–American War
Deaths from emphysema